Tishtony Creek is a stream in the U.S. state of Mississippi.

Tishtony is a name derived from the Chickasaw language purported to mean "assistant guardian, assistant to a person in charge". A variant name is "Hatchiepeloc Creek".

References

Rivers of Mississippi
Rivers of Itawamba County, Mississippi
Mississippi placenames of Native American origin